Lotus pedunculatus (formerly Lotus uliginosus), the big trefoil, greater bird's-foot-trefoil or marsh bird's-foot trefoil, is a member of the pea family (Fabaceae).

It is a herbaceous perennial growing throughout Europe in damp, open locations.

Unlike related species, the stem is always hollow, and the sepals turn back at their tips – these sepal tips form a characteristic "green star" at the end of the flower bud. The peak flowering period in the United Kingdom is June and July.

Lotus pedunculatus occurs in a wide range of neutral, damp, open habitats, including certain fen-meadow plant associations such as Juncus subnodulosus-Cirsium palustre fen-meadow habitat.

Lotus pedunculatus is also a host plant for ovipositioning of the wood white butterfly, Leptidea sinapis.

Gallery

References

External links 
   Forest & Kim Starr. 2002. Images of Hawaii. Photos of L. uliginosus
  Photos of L. uliginosus 
  Images of L. pedunculatus

pedunculatus
Forages
Taxa named by Antonio José Cavanilles